The Casablanca-class escort carrier were a series of escort carriers constructed for the United States Navy during World War II. They are the most numerous class of aircraft carriers ever built. Fifty were laid down, launched and commissioned within the space of less than two years – 3 November 1942 through to 8 July 1944. These were nearly one third of the 143 aircraft carriers built in the United States during the war. Despite their numbers, and the preservation of more famous and larger carriers as museums, none of these modest ships survive today. Five were lost to enemy action during World War II and the remainder were scrapped. navsource.org, Casablanca Class

Casablanca was the first class to be designed from keel up as an escort carrier. It had a larger and more useful hangar deck than previous conversions. Unlike larger carriers which had extensive armor, protection was limited to splinter plating. Their small size made them useful for transporting assembled aircraft of various sizes, but fighters were limited to smaller and lighter aircraft such as the Grumman F4F Wildcat. The hull numbers were assigned consecutively, from CVE-55 Casablanca to CVE-104 Munda.

Casablanca-class carriers were built by the Kaiser Shipbuilding Company's Vancouver Yard on the Columbia River in Vancouver, Washington. The Vancouver yard was expressly built in 1942 to construct Liberty ships, but exigencies of war soon saw the yard building LST landing craft and then escort carriers all before the end of the yard's first year in operation. The yard had twelve building ways and a  outfitting dock along with a unique additional building slip originally intended to add prefabricated superstructures to Liberty ships. Their relatively small size and mass-production origins led their crews to refer to them as "jeep carriers" or "Kaiser Jeeps" with varying degrees of affection.navsource.org, Casablanca Class Carriers, USS Midway (CVE-63)

Naming
The Casablanca class initially continued the US Navy's policy of naming escort carriers after bays and sounds, in this case the numerous inlets of the Alexander Archipelago that form the southwest coastline of Alaska, though several were subsequently renamed to carry on the US Navy's tradition of naming aircraft carriers after battles.  Those ships that appear to be named after islands, seas, straits or cities actually commemorated battles fought at those locations.  Several had their original "Bay" names changed to battle names while under construction, and two of them (Midway and Coral Sea) lost their battle names mid-career to new s, becoming USS St. Lo and USS Anzio respectively. Unlike the larger  and s, none were named to commemorate historical naval vessels.

 Production time and Navy refusal 

Although Essex-class aircraft carriers were completed in 20 months or less, 1941 projections on the basis of the 38-month average pre-war construction period estimated no new fleet carriers could be expected until 1944. Kaiser had reduced construction time of cargo ships (Liberty ships) from more than a year to less than 90 days, and proposed building a fleet of 50 small carriers in less than two years. The US naval authorities refused to approve construction of the Kaiser-built ships until Kaiser went directly to the President's advisers. The Allies were in desperate need of carriers to replace early war losses. Kaiser produced the small carriers as rapidly as planned and resistance to their value quickly disappeared as they proved their usefulness defending convoys, providing air support for amphibious operations, and allowing fleet carriers to focus on offensive air-strike missions. Unlike most other large warships since , the Casablanca-class ships were equipped with uniflow reciprocating engines instead of steam turbines. This was done because of bottlenecks in the gear-cutting industry, but greatly limited their usefulness after the war.

Service

Although designated as convoy escort carriers, the Casablanca class was far more frequently used in large fleet amphibious operations, where speed was less important and their small airgroups could combine to provide the effectiveness of a much larger ship.

Their finest hour came in the Battle off Samar, when Taffy 3, a task unit composed of six of these ships and their screen of three destroyers and four destroyer escorts gave battle against the Japanese main force. Their desperate defense not only preserved most of their own ships, but succeeded in turning back the massive force with only aircraft machine guns, torpedoes, depth charges, high-explosive bombs, and their own 5-inch/38-caliber guns. Tasked with ground support and antisubmarine patrols, they lacked the torpedoes and armor-piercing bombs to tackle a surface fleet alone. Taffy 3 was to be protected by Admiral Halsey's Third Fleet with carriers and battleships. But the Third Fleet had left the scene to pursue a decoy carrier fleet, inadvertently leaving Taffy 3 the only force between the massive Japanese fleet and undefended landing forces at Leyte Gulf. Recent evidence suggests that six 5-inch shells fired from  struck the cruiser Chōkai. One of these rounds was reported to have impacted amidships on the starboard side, causing a large secondary explosion (probably from one of Chōkais own torpedoes) that proved fatal to the heavy cruiser. However, this claim is not supported by Japanese sources, which report this damage as resulting from an air attack.

Another noteworthy achievement of the Casablanca class was when , under command of Captain Daniel V. Gallery, participated in the first capture-at-sea of a foreign warship by the US Navy since the War of 1812 when a crew of volunteers from  boarded  after Gallery's Guadalcanal-centered hunter-killer group forced it to the surface with depth charges. Guadalcanal also earned the distinction of being the only aircraft carrier in history to conduct flight operations with a captured enemy vessel in tow.navsource.org, USS Guadalcanal CVE-60

Notable incidents
Of the eleven United States aircraft carriers of all types lost during World War II, six were escort carriers, five of which were of the Kaiser-built Casablanca class:

 CVE-56 Liscome Bay
Sunk 24 November 1943. Submarine torpedo launched from IJN I-175 SW off Butaritari (Makin).
 CVE-73 Gambier Bay
Sunk 25 October 1944. Concentrated surface gunfire from IJN Center Force during Battle off Samar.
 CVE-63 St. Lo (ex-Midway ex-Chapin Bay)
Sunk 25 October 1944. Kamikaze aerial attack during Battle of Leyte Gulf.
 CVE-79 Ommaney Bay
Sunk 4 January 1945. Kamikaze aerial attack in the Sulu Sea en route to Lingayen Gulf.
 CVE-95 Bismarck Sea
Sunk 21 February 1945. Kamikaze aerial attack off Iwo Jima.
CVE-96 Anguilla Bay renamed USS Salamaua 
Damaged at Lingayen Gulf on 6 January 1945 after kamikaze with two 551-pound (250 kg) bombs hit her flight deck. She was repaired and put back in service.

Post war

Some ships were retained postwar as aircraft transports, where their lack of speed was not a major drawback. Some units were reactivated as helicopter escort carriers (CVHE and T-CVHE) or utility carriers (CVU and T-CVU) after the war, but most were deactivated and placed in reserve once the war ended, stricken in 1958-9 and scrapped in 1959–61. One ship, was heavily modified into an amphibious assault ship (LPH-6), but was scrapped in 1966.

Ships of the class
All ships of the Casablanca class were built in Vancouver, Washington, by the Kaiser Shipbuilding Company. The following ships of the class were constructed.

See also

 List of ship classes of World War II

References
pps. 1 & 2 – "Kaiser Company, Inc. – Vancouver", BuShips QQ files, NARA, College Park, MD.- "The Ships We Build", Kaiser Company, Inc., n.d., c. immediate post-war, 1945.
   Listing of ships at Hazegray.org

External links

 The Battle Off Samar – Taffy III at Leyte Gulf website by Robert Jon Cox

Escort aircraft carrier classes
 Casablanca class escort carrier
 Casablanca class escort carrier
Vancouver, Washington
S4-S2-BB3 ships